Heyran-e Olya may refer to:
 Heyran-e Olya, East Azerbaijan
 Heyran-e Olya, Gilan